Junda Iman Gunda is a 2007 Assamese language romantic comedy film starring Bikram Rajkhowa and Angoorlata in the lead. The film was directed by Chandra Mudoi and released on 7 September 2007. The songs from this movie received good appreciation, including one by Debojit Saha. The film was a blockbuster.

Cast
Bikram Rajkhowa
Angoorlata
Abdul Mazid
Bhaskar Das
Chabi Bhoralee
Juri Sarma
Kalpana Kalita
Upasana Bhoralee

Soundtrack

The music of Junda Iman Gunda is composed by Dr Hitesh Baruah.

Note
 Track 8, 9 and 10 are Bonus Track and was not featured in the film.

See also
List of Assamese films of the 2000s

References

External links 

 

2007 films
2007 romantic comedy films
Films set in Assam
Indian romantic comedy films
2000s Assamese-language films